Project Neon may refer to:

 Microsoft Fluent Design System, previously referred to as Project Neon
 Project Neon, a design–build public works project in the Las Vegas, Nevada area